Fire from Heaven is a novel by Mary Renault.

Fire from Heaven may also refer to:
 Fire from Heaven: A Study of Spontaneous Combustion in Human Beings, a book by Michael Harrison
 "Fire from Heaven" (comics), a Wildstorm comics company-wide story arc
 Fire from Heaven, a book in the Left Behind: The Kids series by Jerry B. Jenkins and Tim LaHaye

See also
 The Fires of Heaven, a Wheel of Time novel by Robert Jordan
 Far from Heaven, a 2002 film